Assane Attyé better known by his stage name Ycare or (born 21 September 1983) is a French singer songwriter who was first known as a contestant in Nouvelle Star before launching a solo career releasing four studio albums, Au bord du monde (2009), Lumière noire (2011), La Somone (2014) and Adieu je t'aime (2018) and a live album Un tour sans fin (2016).

Beginnings
Attyé was born in Dakar, Senegal to Lebanese parents. Suffering an accident in his early life, he took on learning playing the guitar and wrote his own songs early on. After obtaining his high school diploma, he moved to France to continue his education and sang in various cafés in Montpellier region. Then he resided in Paris for an MBA degree and becoming a trader in natural resources.

Nouvelle Star
Attyé took part in the casting for Nouvelle Star, in its sixth season, a music competition show in French on the M6 channel using the stage name Ycare Cavens for an opportunity to sing in front of judges André Manoukian, Lio, Sinclair and Philippe Manœuvre. The season started on 2 April 2008 and continued until 11 June 2008. His performances included:

Ycare was eliminated after his performances on 28 May 2008 finishing fourth for the season, with the title going to Amandine Bourgeois, and Benjamin Siksou as runner up and Cédric Oheix as third.

Career after Nouvelle Star
Immediately after Nouvelle Star, he returned to Dakar, to record some of his work at Youssou N'Dour's studio. Ycare gave two concerts in Dakar in front of 2000 people, followed by a show at Fnac Montparnasse (Paris 6eme arrondissement) and a concert at Glaz'art in Paris to a full house.

In 2009, a year after Nouvelle Star, he released his debut album Au bord du monde on 29 June 2009 at Jive Epic (Sony Music). It was produced by Patrice Renson and Olivier Lude, with "Alison" as the first single from the album.

On 6 June 2011, came his second album Lumière Noire with Sony, with "Lap Dance" taken from the album becoming his first charting hit single in the French charts. He is also well known for tracks "Schizophrène" and "S.E.EX" and has collaborated with Zula in "Vite fait".

"La Somone" is his third album released in 2014. Two singles were released: "Pourvu que tu viennes" and "Sors". The video for "Pourvu que tu viennes" was shot in Dakar, Senegal.

In 2015, Ycare decided to become independent and raised 36, 232 € on KissKissBankBank from 663 contributors. He will release an E.P. "Hiver 2016" in early 2016.

Songwriting
Writing most of his music, Ycare has become a successful songwriter for a number of artists including songs for Nolwenn Leroy, Garou, Louis Delort and Joyce Jonathan. Although using the pseudonym Ycare for his own releases, he continues to credit his birth name Assane Attyé for his songwriting contributions.

In popular culture
In 2011, he became part of Collectif Paris-Africa, a French group and French speaking international artists united by UNICEF. Its purpose is to collect money for nutrition and food for the poor countries in Horn of Africa. The group released a single called "Des ricochets" ("skimming stones"), referring to the poor availability of fresh water in the area) which was followed by compilation album Collectif Paris-Africa pour l'Unicef.

Ycare was part of the charity song "Les voix de l'enfant" (meaning the voices of the child) with other artists that included Yannick Noah, Lorie, M. Pokora, Mélissa Nkonda, Hugues Aufray, Joyce Jonathan, Nicolas Peyrac, Sheryfa Luna, Grégoire, Jenifer, Merwan Rim, Gérard Lenorman, Emmanuel Moire, Dominique Magloire, Mani, Priscilla, Mickael Miro, Rose, Philippe Lavil, Marie Myriam, Mikelangelo Loconte, Melissa Mars, Faudel, Anggun, Stanisla, Julie Zenatti, Colonel Reyel, Annie Cordy, Yves Duteil, Pauline Delpech, Pierre Souchon, Judith, Quentin Mosimann, Lââm, Michael Jones, Cylia and Collectif Métissé. The release was funded through a campaign with My Major Company. and was released in 2013.

Discography

Studio albums

Live albums

EPs
2015: Hiver 2015
2016: Été 2016

Singles

*Did not appear in the official Belgian Ultratop 50 charts, but rather in the bubbling under Ultratip charts.

Videography
2009: "Alison"
2009: "J'y crois encore"
2011: "Lap Dance"
2011: "S.E.Ex"
2012: "Une vie"
2012: "Arrête" (with Florent Mothe)
2013: "Pourvu que tu viennes"
2013: "Sors"
2015: "La mer à voir"
2016: "Love You (J'te déteste)"
2017: "D'autres que nous (14 Boulevard Saint-Michel)"
2018: "Cette moitié de nous"
2018: "Adieu je t'aime"
2018: "A qui la faute" (with Hoshi)

References

External links
Official website
Discogs.com

French songwriters
Male songwriters
1983 births
Living people
People from Dakar
French people of Lebanese descent
21st-century French singers
21st-century French male singers